The Anseba River is a tributary of the Barka River in Eritrea with a length of 346 kilometers.  It rises in the Eritrean Highlands outside Asmara and flows in a northwestern direction through Keren. It merges with the Barka River near the border with Sudan.

References

Anseba River